Chester Hamlin Werkman (June 17, 1893, Fort Wayne, Indiana – September 10, 1962, Ames, Iowa) was an American microbiologist. He is known as one of the pioneers of understanding and reconstructing the enzymatic processes involved in bacterial metabolic processes.

Biography
After completing secondary school in Fort Wayne, he briefly worked for a railroad company. He then matriculated at Purdue University, where he graduated in 1919 with a B.S. in chemistry. In 1919, for a few months, he did routine research for the Food and Drug Administration in the Department of Agriculture. In September 1919 he became a chemistry instructor at the University of Idaho. In September 1920 he became a graduate student in the bacteriology department of Iowa State University. There in 1923 he received his doctorate with dissertation Immunologic Significance of Vitamins under the supervision of Robert Earle Buchanan. For the academic year 1924–1925 Werkman was an assistant professor in microbiology at the University of Massachusetts. At Iowa State University, he was from 1925 to 1927 an assistant professor, from 1927 to 1933 an associate professor, and from 1933 to retirement a full professor. From 1945 until retirement, he was the head of the bacteriology department, but a number of his colleagues considered his control of the department "petty and autocratic".

Influenced by Albert Jan Kluyver, Werkman directed Iowa State's microbiological department toward biochemical methods, which before Werkman's influence was somewhat more oriented toward botany and zoology. In his laboratory he worked with several noteworthy researchers over the years, including Lester O. Krampitz and Merton F. Utter (both of whom were his doctoral students). Working with Harland G. Wood in 1936 led to an outstanding result, when it was discovered that some bacteria (of the genus Propionibacterium) can utilize CO2 as chemotrophs. Wood and Werkman's work followed pioneering research by Cornelis Bernardus van Niel in Kluyver's laboratory.

In 1944 he was awarded an honorary doctorate by Purdue University. In 1946 he was elected a member of the United States National Academy of Sciences.

He married Cecile Baker in 1913. Their son Robert Theodore Werkman (1915–2012) became a chemical engineer and a U.S. Army captain, who participated in the Battle of the Bulge.

Selected publications

References

1893 births
1962 deaths
American microbiologists
Purdue University alumni
Iowa State University alumni
Iowa State University faculty
Members of the United States National Academy of Sciences